MacMichael is a surname. Notable people with the surname include: 

 David MacMichael, Central Intelligence Agency (CIA) analyst
 Harold MacMichael (1882–1969), British colonial administrator
 Kevin MacMichael (1951–2002), Canadian guitarist, songwriter and record producer
 William Macmichael (1783–1839), English physician and medical biographer

See also 
 McMichael (disambiguation)

Patronymic surnames
Surnames from given names